Adbert Marcelo Alzolay (born March 1, 1995) is a Venezuelan professional baseball pitcher for the Chicago Cubs of Major League Baseball (MLB). He made his MLB debut in 2019.

Career
Alzolay signed with the Chicago Cubs as an international free agent in November 2012. He made his professional debut in 2013 with the Venezuelan Summer League Cubs and spent the whole season there, posting a 5–3 record and 1.07 ERA in 15 games. He pitched with the Arizona League Cubs and Boise Hawks in 2014, going a combined 2–5 with a 7.90 ERA in ten total games between both teams, the Eugene Emeralds in 2015 where he went 6–2 with a 2.04 ERA, and the South Bend Cubs in 2016, pitching to a 9–4 record and 4.34 ERA in 22 games (twenty starts).

Alzolay spent 2017 with both the Myrtle Beach Pelicans and the Tennessee Smokies, posting a combined 7–4 record and 2.99 ERA in 22 starts. After the season, he played in the Arizona Fall League and was selected to play in the Fall Stars Game. The Cubs added him to their 40-man roster after the season.

He appeared in 8 games for the Iowa Cubs in 2018, before suffering a strained lat muscle that ended his season. He opened the 2019 season on the injured list with a recurrence of the injury. Upon returning, he played one game with Myrtle Beach and then was assigned to Iowa. 

On June 20, 2019, Alzolay was called up to the major leagues for the first time. He made his MLB debut that night versus the New York Mets, recording five strikeouts over four innings in relief. Alzolay appeared in six games for the Cubs in 2020, pitching to a 1–1 record and 2.95 ERA with 29 strikeouts in 21.1 innings pitched.

Alzolay was placed on the 60-day injured list to start the 2022 on season on March 18, 2022. It was announced that he had suffered a right shoulder strain that could sideline him for half of the season.

See also
 List of Major League Baseball players from Venezuela

References

External links

Living people
1995 births
People from Ciudad Guayana
Venezuelan expatriate baseball players in the United States
Major League Baseball players from Venezuela
Major League Baseball pitchers
Chicago Cubs players
Venezuelan Summer League Cubs players
Arizona League Cubs players
Boise Hawks players
Eugene Emeralds players
South Bend Cubs players
Myrtle Beach Pelicans players
Tennessee Smokies players
Iowa Cubs players
Mesa Solar Sox players